Yukon Flats School District (YFSD) is a school district headquartered in Fort Yukon, Alaska.

Schools
They are:
 Arctic Village School (Arctic Village)
 Cruikshank School (Beaver)
 John Fredson School (Venetie)
 Fort Yukon School (Fort Yukon)
 Tsuk Taih School (Chalkyitsik)
 Circle School (Circle)

Closed schools:
 Birch Creek
 Central

School Board 
The Yukon Flats School Board is governed by a seven-member school board composed of:

References

External links
 

Buildings and structures in Yukon–Koyukuk Census Area, Alaska
Education in Unorganized Borough, Alaska
Fort Yukon, Alaska
School districts in Alaska